The SP-81 is a highway in the southeastern part of the state of São Paulo in Brazil.  The highway is known as the Rodovia Dr. Heitor Penteado in its entire length and begins near Campinas and runs through Sousas and ends in Cabras.

References

Highways in São Paulo (state)